National Cycle Route 11 is a bikeway in England on the UK's National Cycle Network, connecting Harlow in Essex to King's Lynn in Norfolk.

Route

Harlow to Cambridge

Harlow | Bishop Stortford | Hinxton | Sawston | Cambridge

Intersects with National Cycle Route 51 in Cambridge.

This gene, implicated in early-onset breast cancer, was discovered in 1994; the discoverers included scientists from nearby Addenbrooke's Hospital and the Sanger Institute, Hinxton.

This section of path also includes and commemorates the 10,000th mile of the National Cycle Network. It is fondly referred to by regular users as "The DNA path". It offers a fine view of White Hill and Clarke's Hill, which are the northernmost peaks of the Gog Magog Hills.

Cambridge to King's Lynn
Cambridge | Burwell | Wicken | Ely | Downham Market | Watlington | King's Lynn

Intersects with National Cycle Route 1 near King's Lynn

Proposed development

Wicken Fen Vision Spine Route

Route 11 between Cambridge and Ely had a gap in the route, due to the difficulties of crossing the many waterways of the Cambridgeshire Fens. In 2011, the new bridge over Swaffham Bulbeck Lode, and surfacing of several sections of cycle path enables complete use of the route. This section of route 11 had been called the Wicken Fen Vision Spine Route, but in 2011 was named the Lodes Way. The project involves the construction of 18 km of cycleway and of a number of bridges over the man-made waterways known as lodes. The Lodes Way still has a foot bridge over Burwell Lode with restricted use. A new bridge is scheduled for completion in 2013. The project has received funding of £600,000 from the Sustrans Connect2 scheme.

References

Transport in Essex
Transport in Cambridgeshire
National Cycle Routes